is a Japanese sports shooter. She competed in the women's 25 metre pistol event at the 1984 Summer Olympics.

References

1959 births
Living people
Japanese female sport shooters
Olympic shooters of Japan
Shooters at the 1984 Summer Olympics
Place of birth missing (living people)
Shooters at the 1986 Asian Games
Asian Games medalists in shooting
Asian Games silver medalists for Japan
Medalists at the 1986 Asian Games
20th-century Japanese women